The 1933 All-Eastern football team consists of American football players chosen by various selectors as the best players at each position among the Eastern colleges and universities during the 1933 college football season.

All-Eastern selections

Quarterbacks
 Cliff Montgomery, Columbia (AP-1 [hb], UP-1, CP)
 Johnson, Army (AP-1)

Halfbacks
 Jack Buckler, Army (AP-1, UP-1, CP)
 Ed Danowski, Fordham (UP-1)
 Le Van, Princeton (CP)

Fullbacks
 Izzy Weinstock, Pittsburgh (AP-1, UP-1)
 Danowski, Fordham (CP)

Ends
 Joe Skladany, Pittsburgh (AP-1, UP-1, CP)
 Red Matal, Columbia (UP-1, CP)
 Borden, Fordham (AP-1)

Tackles
 Charles Harvey, Holy Cross (AP-1, UP-1, CP)
 Charles Ceppi, Princeton (AP-1, UP-1, CP)

Guards
 Harvey Jablonsky, Army (AP-1, UP-1, CP)
 Rado, Duquesne (AP-1)
 David Zabriskie, Navy (UP-1)
 Bunny Burzio, Carnegie Tech (CP)

Centers
 Johnny Dell Isola, Fordham (AP-1, UP-1, CP)

Key
 AP = Associated Press
 UP = United Press
 CP = Central Press Association, selected by the football captains of the Eastern teams

See also
 1933 College Football All-America Team

References

All-Eastern
All-Eastern college football teams